Chapin's babbler (Turdoides chapini) or Chapin's mountain-babbler, is a species of passerine bird in the family Leiothrichidae. It is endemic to the Democratic Republic of the Congo. Its natural habitat is subtropical or tropical moist montane forests. It is threatened by habitat loss.

The common name and the Latin binomial commemorate the American ornithologist James Paul Chapin.

Chapin's babbler was moved from the genus Kupeornis to Turdoides based on the results of a molecular phylogenetic study published in 2018.

References

Collar, N. J. & Robson, C. 2007. Family Timaliidae (Babblers)  pp. 70 – 291 in; del Hoyo, J., Elliott, A. & Christie, D.A. eds. Handbook of the Birds of the World, Vol. 12. Picathartes to Tits and Chickadees. Lynx Edicions, Barcelona.

Chapin's babbler
Endemic birds of the Democratic Republic of the Congo
Chapin's babbler
Chapin's babbler
Taxonomy articles created by Polbot
Taxobox binomials not recognized by IUCN